Live Concert at the Forum (retitled Barbra Streisand Live in Canada) is the second live album by American singer Barbra Streisand, released physically on October 1, 1972 by Columbia Records. Produced by long-time collaborator Richard Perry, it was recorded at The Forum in Inglewood, part of Greater Los Angeles, on April 15, 1972, during Four for McGovern, a concert held in benefit for George McGovern's 1972 presidential campaign. A CD version of Live Concert at the Forum was released on September 6, 1989.

The concert setlist and between-song patter was brought forward from Streisand's December 1971 – January 1972 residency at the Las Vegas Hilton. Streisand's medley of "Sweet Inspiration" and "Where You Lead", medley of "Sing" and "Make Your Own Kind of Music", and "Didn't We" were released as the album's three singles, all throughout 1972. The lead single was nominated for Best Female Pop Vocal Performance at the 15th Annual Grammy Awards in 1973. Music critics responded well to the album, with many commending Streisand's strong vocal performance. Commercially, Live Concert at the Forum peaked at numbers 17 and 19 on the album charts in Canada and the United States, respectively, and received a Platinum certification from the Recording Industry Association of America for shipments exceeding one million copies.

Background 

Her first live album since 1968's A Happening in Central Park, Barbra Streisand released her second one, Live Concert at the Forum, on October 1, 1972. The album's songs were recorded during Streisand's segment of the Four for McGovern concert held on April 15, 1972, at The Forum indoor arena in Inglewood. Superstar singers Carole King, James Taylor and Streisand headlined the concert along with Quincy Jones and his Orchestra. The concert was a benefit for George McGovern's 1972 presidential campaign. Tickets for the performance ranged in price from $5.50 to $100.00 USD and the event itself grossed over $300,000; however, after covering the expenses for the show, McGovern's campaign only received approximately $18,000 in donations. In a mock warning on the evils of weed, Streisand lit up a joint during one of her songs and pretended she was under the influence of marijuana while performing.

Richard Perry produced the album's 11 tracks, most of which are selections taken from previous works in Streisand's music catalog. Arrangements for the songs were headed by Don Costa, Don Hannah, Peter Matz, Claus Ogerman and Gene Page. David Shire served as the conductor on Live Concert at the Forum and Eddie Kendricks was Streisand's vocal director.

Singles 

Three singles were released from Live Concert at the Forum throughout 1972. The medley of "Sweet Inspiration" and "Where You Lead" was released as the album's lead single on May 25, 1972 on 7-inch vinyl with B-side track "Didn't We". The four female Eddie Kendricks singers – Venetta Fields, Marti McCall, Geraldine Jones and Clydie King – are heard prominently on backing vocals. This medley was the most commercially successful single on Live Concert at the Forum, peaking at number 37 in both the United States and Canada. In addition to being nominated at the 15th Annual Grammy Awards for Best Female Pop Vocal Performance, Streisand would later feature this live rendition on her second greatest hits album, Barbra Streisand's Greatest Hits Volume 2 (1978).

Her medley of "Sing" and "Make Your Own Kind of Music" served as the album's second single in August 1972 and was paired with her live performance of "Starting Here, Starting Now" as the B-side. It reached number 94 on the Billboard Hot 100 and entered the lower positions of the Adult Contemporary charts in both Canada and the United States.

Streisand's version of "Didn't We" was released as the album's third and final single in November 1972. Columbia Records distributed the single on 7-inch vinyl alongside B-side track "On a Clear Day You Can See Forever". According to Julian Coleman of Billboard, the cover was popular on soul radio and was frequently on rotation for airplay. Her rendition peaked at number 82 on the Billboard Hot 100 and on the Adult Contemporary charts in the United States and Canada, it reached numbers 22 and 46, respectively.

Reception 

Live Concert at the Forum received a positive response from music critics. William Ruhlmann from AllMusic awarded the album three out of five stars, enjoying the noticeable differences of "how much her music ha[s] changed since her first [live album] had been released four years before". Singling out her performances of "People" and "Stoney End", he noted that they both "demonstrate Streisand's versatility" as a musician. Ruhlmann also complimented her vocals, acknowledged her "powerful delivery", and enjoyed her commentary during the monologue, finding it to be "as dated as it was timely in 1972". Also singling out Streisand's vocal delivery, Rolling Stones Jon Landau wrote that "there is something about that big, beautiful, instantly recognizable voice singing in front of a strictly pro big band that casts a shadow over the material"; describing it as a pop record, he called "On a Clear Day (You Can See Forever)" the album's best track and felt that the album's "shortcomings never really seem to matter".

In the United States, the album debuted at number 100 on the Billboard 200 for the week ending November 18, 1972. On January 6 of the following year, Live Concert at the Forum peaked at number 19. The Recording Industry Association of America certified the live album Gold for shipments upwards of 500,000 sales on February 13, 1973 and upgraded the certification to Platinum for shipments of one million on November 21, 1986. In Canada, where the album was released under the title Barbra Streisand Live, it peaked at a slightly higher position. The record debuted on the list, compiled by RPM, at number 94 on December 2, 1972 and during the following month it would peak at number 17. According to the liner notes of Barbra's  retrospective box set: Just for the Record... (1991), the album also received a record certification in Canada.

Track listing 
All songs are executively produced by Richard Perry.

Personnel 
Credits adapted from the liner notes of the standard edition of Live Concert at the Forum.

 Barbra Streisand vocals
 Don Costa arranging 
 Customatrix mastering
 Don Hannah arranging 
 Eddie Kendricks vocal director
Venetta Fields, Marti McCall, Geraldine Jones, Clydie Kingbacking vocals
 Peter Matz arranging 

 Claus Ogerman arranging 
 Gene Page arranging 
 Richard Perry producer
 Bill Schnee engineering
 David Shire conductor

Charts

Certifications

References

Citations

Bibliography

External links 
 

1972 live albums
1972 United States presidential election
Albums arranged by Claus Ogerman
Albums arranged by Don Costa
Albums arranged by Gene Page
Albums arranged by Peter Matz
Albums conducted by David Shire
Albums recorded at the Forum
Barbra Streisand live albums
Columbia Records live albums